True Romance is the fourth studio album by British rapper and singer Estelle. The album was released on February 17, 2015, by Established 1980 Records. The album was supported by the singles "Make Her Say (Beat It Up)" and "Conqueror".

The album's sleeve was designed by Rebecca Sugar, creator of the animated series Steven Universe in which Estelle provided the voice of the character Garnet.

Singles
The first single, "Make Her Say (Beat It Up)", was released on February 18, 2014. On April 15, 2014, the music video was released with a Clear Version of the song.

The album's second single "Conqueror" was released on July 22, 2014. The track was featured in the 2014 film Addicted. A version of the song was recorded alongside Jussie Smollett for the 2015 TV series Empire, refuelling sales of the single (peaking at No. 42 on the Billboard Hot 100 and No. 15 on R&B) and making it her biggest US hit since her Grammy-winning "American Boy". On July 21, 2014, the music video was released.

Critical reception

True Romance received generally positive reviews from music critics. At Metacritic, which assigns a normalized rating out of 100 to reviews from critics, the album received an average score of 64, which indicates "generally favorable reviews", based on 9 reviews. Andy Kellman of AllMusic said, "Patched together and seemingly out-of-character as it is, the singer's fourth album does have more going for it than her third one did." Pat Levy of Consequence of Sound said, "With her fourth album, British singer/rapper Estelle postures as a Beyoncé-type figure and fails to achieve comparable results. Clunky songwriting and mediocre lyrics sink an album full of strong production choices and prove that Estelle is unlikely to claim anything more than a spot as the JV Bey. True Romance isn’t going to help Estelle’s quest to remove herself from the one-hit wonder category (and “American Boy” sure was a hit). In all likelihood, it will further separate her from the pop stardom she’s seeking." Sam C. Mac of Slant Magazine said, "Singing big string-laden power ballads, flexing her often-underutilized rap cadence over patient house grooves, and unapologetically indulging her distinctive genre tastes, True Romance largely proves that Estelle's talents were being too encumbered by the demands of record execs and producer John Legend, delivering a fleet 45 minutes of music that sounds more true to her West London upbringing."

Track listing

Notes
  signifies an additional producer
"Silly Girls" contains a sample of "I Don't Want to Play Around" by Ace Spectrum, written by Ed Zant and Aubrey Johnson

Charts

References

Album chart usages for BillboardRandBHipHop
2015 albums
Estelle (musician) albums
Albums produced by J.U.S.T.I.C.E. League
Albums produced by Best Kept Secret (production team)